HMG-box containing 4 is a protein that in humans is encoded by the HMGXB4 gene.

Function

High mobility group (HMG) proteins are nonhistone chromosomal proteins. See HMG2 (MIM 163906) for additional information on HMG proteins.[supplied by OMIM, Nov 2010].

References

Further reading